A number of units of measurement were used in Indonesia to measure length, mass, capacity, etc. Metric system adopted in 1923 and has been compulsory in Indonesia since 1938.

System before metric system

Old Dutch and local measures were used under Dutch East Indies. Local measures were very variable, and later they have been legally defined with their metric equivalents.

Length

A number of units were used to measure length.  One depa was equal to 1.70 m by its legal definition.  Some other units and their legal equivalents are given below:

1 hasta =  depa

1 kilan =  depa.

Mass

A number of units were used to measure mass.

Ordinary

One pikol (or one pecul) was equal to  kg by its legal definition.  Some other units and their legal equivalents are given below:

1 thail =  pikol 

1 catti =  pikol 

1 kabi =  pikol 

1 kulack = 0.0725 pikol 

1 amat = 2 pikol 

1 small bahar = 3 pikol 

1 large bahar = 4.5 pikol 

1 timbang = 5 pikol 

1 kojang (Batavia) = 27 pikol = 1667.555 kg

1 kojang (Semarang) = 28 pikol = 1729.316 kg

1 kojang (Soerabaya) = 30 pikol = 1852.839 kg.

For precious metals

One thail was equal to 54.090 kg by its legal definition.  Some other units and their legal equivalents are given below:

1 wang =  thail

1 tali =  thail

1 soekoe =  thail

1 reaal =  thail.

For opium

One thail was equal to 38.601 kg by its legal definition.  Some other units and their legal equivalents are given below:

1 tji =  thail

1 tjembang Mata =  thail

1 hoen =  thail.

Area

Several units were used to measure area.  One bahoe (or 1 bouw) was equal to 7096.5 m2 and lieue2 (Geographic) was equal to 55.0632 km by its legal definition.

Capacity

Two systems, dry and liquid, were used to measure capacity.

Dry

Several units were used to measure dry capacity.  One kojang was equal to 2011.2679 L by its legal definition.  One pikol was equal to  kojang.

Liquid

A number of units were used to measure liquid capacity.  Some other units and their legal equivalents are given below:

1 takar (for oil) = 25.770 L

1 kit (for oil) = 15.159 L

1 koelak (for oil) = 3.709 L

1 kan (for various products) = 1.575 L

1 mutsje (for various products) = 0.1516 L

1 pintje (for oil) = 0.0758 L.

Sumatra

Several local units were used in Sumatra.

Length

Units for length included:

1 etto = 2 jankal

1 hailoh = 2 etto

1 tung = 4 hailoh = 12 feet.

Capacity

Units for capacity included:

1 koolah = 2.1173 bushel

1 pakha = 0.14535 gallon.

Mass

Units for mass included:

1 catty = 2.118 lb

1 maund = 77 lb

1 pecul =  lb

1 candil =  lb

1 ootan (for camphor) = 4 lb.

Java

Several local units were used in Java.  Old Dutch units too were in use, and other units were varied for example one town to another.:

Length

One covid was equal to  yard and other units were Dutch.

Mass

Units for mass included:

1 gantang (for coffee) = 10 catties

1 pecul = 100 catties = 135.6312 lb

1 bahar (at Bantam) = 396 lb

1 bahar (at Bantam; used for pepper) = 406.78 lb

1 bahar (at Batavia) = 610.17 lb

1 timbang (for grain) = 677.9625 lb

1 tael (at Bantam) = 0.1511 lb

1 tael  (at Batavia) = 0.0847 lb.

Capacity

Units for capacity included:

1 kanne = 0.394 gallons

1 legger (for arrack) = 160.0 gallons

1 bambou (at Bantam) = 0.09223 bushels

1 koyang = 147.568 bushels

1 koyang (at Batavia; measure for rise) =  bushels.

Celebes (Modern Sulawesi)

Units were resemble or identical with the units of neighbouring islands under Netherlands.

Mass
One pecul was equal to 135.64 lb.

Molucca Islands

Dutch units and other units resembling the units in Java, Sumatra, etc. were used.

Amboyna

Mass

Units included:

1 bahar = 597.61 lb

1 mace =  grain

1 tael = 55.3371 bushel.

Ternate

Mass
One catty was equal to 1.3017 lb.

References

Indonesian culture
Indonesia